Dubon or Dubón may refer to:

Dubon coat, Israel Defense Forces windproof military winter coat
Estadio Meliton Dubón, a stadium located in Macuelizo, Santa Barbara

People 

Edipcia Dubón, Nicaraguan politician and human rights activist
Eduardo Epaminondas González Dubón, president of the Constitutional Court of Guatemala who was assassinated in 1994
Mauricio Dubón (born 1994), Honduran professional baseball player
Víctor Hugo Merino Dubón (born 1979), a Salvadoran soccer player